Nehmetawy (nḥm.t-ˁw3ỉ; "she who embraces those in need") is a goddess in the ancient Egyptian religion. She is not very widely known. Nehmetawy was the wife of snake god Nehebu-kau, or in other places of worship, like in Hermopolis, the wife of Thoth. Her depictions are anthropomorph, with a sistrum-shaped headdress, often with a child in her lap.

References

Egyptian goddesses